Toni Dzangarovski (Macedonian: Тони Џангаровски born 17 June 1985 in SR Macedonia, SFR Yugoslavia) is a Macedonian retired footballer who last played for FK Makedonija Gjorče Petrov in his home country.

Club career 
Spending his career predominantly in his native Macedonia, Dzangarovski sealed his first move abroad alongside Nikola Nikancevski in 2013 to Zwekapin United of the Myanmar National League on a one-year contract, making his debut in a 0-2 defeat to Yangon United.

Transferring to Maldivian team Maziya S&RC in 2015, the Macedonian defender was captain for the club, winning the 2016 Dhivehi Premier League and coming close to singing for KF Llapi of the Kosovo Superliga.

References

External links 
 at Soccerway

1985 births
Living people
Footballers from Skopje
Association football central defenders
Macedonian footballers
FK Vardar players
FK Gorno Lisiče players
Zwegabin United F.C. players
FK Makedonija Gjorče Petrov players
Maziya S&RC players
Macedonian First Football League players
Macedonian Second Football League players
Myanmar National League players
Macedonian expatriate footballers
Expatriate footballers in Myanmar
Macedonian expatriate sportspeople in Myanmar
Expatriate footballers in the Maldives